Segamat Inner Ring Road, Johor State Routes J152, J216 and J217 is a 4-lane single carriageway municipal ring road system in Segamat, Johor, Malaysia. The ring road consists of Jalan Pemuda (Johor State Route J152), Jalan Hassan (Johor State Route J216), Segamat Second Bridge, Jalan Hassan Abdullah (both are Johor State Route J217), Jalan Pee Kang Hai and Jalan Chia Chin Koon.

History
Before 20th century, the main medium of transportation in Segamat was via rivers. However, the mode of transportation in Segamat began to change when the British colonial government began constructing the national railroad system and road networks (Federal Route 1 and Federal Route 23 passing through Segamat. As a result, several municipal roads were also built as well to connect the nearby villages to Segamat.

Since then, Jalan Pemuda and Jalan Hassan were primarily used as bypass routes when the main road (Federal Route 1 were closed during special occasions and events. The traffic rate along Federal Route 1 continued to rise every year as a result of the population increase, therefore the 8-kilometer section of the main road in Segamat was upgraded to 4-lane single-carriageway (dual-carriageway in the town center) in 1985.

As a result of the rise of traffic rate, traffic jams are common especially at the main bridge of Segamat. As a result, the federal government of Malaysia decided to build a second bridge of Segamat to reduce traffic congestion at the main bridge. The construction of the bridge began at the end of 1998 and completed in 2001. Soon after the completion of the bridge, a new dual-carriageway road, Jalan Hassan Abdullah, was constructed by Malaysian Public Works Department (JKR) of Segamat, connecting the second bridge to Jalan Pee Kang Hai.

In 1996, Segamat was chosen as the state-level host of the Malaysian National Day. At that time, the detour routes especially the 2-lane Jalan Hassan and Jalan Pemuda were badly congested and were unable to handle the incredible volume of traffic during the celebration. As a result, the JKR of Segamat decided to develop an inner ring road system by upgrading the existing 2-lane municipal roads such as Jalan Pemuda, Jalan Hassan, Jalan Pee Kang Hai and Jalan Chia Chin Koon to 4-lane single carriageway. The construction of Segamat Second Bridge was also included in the ring road package. Construction began right after the completion of Segamat Second Bridge in 2001 and completed in August 2005, several weeks before National Day celebration of 2005.

After the completion of Segamat Inner Ring Road, the ring road was used to divert the traffic when Segamat was once again chosen as the venue of the Johor state-level celebration of the 2005 Malaysian National Day. Unlike the 1996 celebration, the traffic flow was very smooth during the 2005 National Day celebration.

List of junctions

See also
 Transport in Malaysia

Segamat District
Roads in Johor
Ring roads in Malaysia